Bellerive Beach is a popular beach destination along the River Derwent in Bellerive, Hobart, Tasmania. The south facing beach neighbours the historic Kangaroo Battery coastal defences and has views of the Derwent estuary, Howrah, Tranmere and Sandy Bay on the western shore. Bellerive Beach has an adjoining parkland with play equipment, barbecues and bathroom facilities and is backed by the Bellerive Oval, a narrow tree-lined reserve and private properties.

History
Prior to the British colonisation of Tasmania, the land had been occupied for possibly as long as 35,000 years by the semi-nomadic Mouheneener people, a sub-group of the Nuennone, or "South-East tribe". Mouheneener abalone shell middens were discovered on the beach in 1980.

Originally called Kangaroo Point, the suburb of Bellerive was settled in the 1820s. The name was changed to Bellerive, meaning "beautiful shore" in French, in the 1830s. Bellerive Beach has historically been a popular staple of local activity, used for exercise, beach combing, horse races, regattas, sailing races and swimming.

In 2015, the Clarence City Council put forward their Bellerive Beach "master plan" to include a cafe and restaurant, bathers’ pavilion and other amenities.
Almost 650 Clarence residents signed a petition asking the Clarence City Council not to move the 56 space carpark at Bellerive Oval.
In 2020, residents complained that work on the project was too slow and not in line with the original 2015 vision.

Clarence Foreshore Trail
A $600,000 shared cycle pathway connecting the Clarence Foreshore Trail from Bellerive Beach to the Derwent River ferry service at Bellerive was opened in 2021.

Marine life
Caused by microscopic plankton, a bioluminescence phenomenon intermittently occurs in the beach's waters in the evening.
A colony of little penguins (Eudyptula minor) nest behind the dunes at Bellerive Beach, and can be viewed coming ashore after dark.
Dog restrictions are monitored and enforced by the Clarence City Council as a means to protect the penguins.

Although uncommon, there were sightings of the deadly southern blue-ringed octopus (Hapalochlaena maculosa) at Kangaroo Bluff in 2019. The Australian swellshark (Cephaloscyllium laticeps)  bottlenose dolphins (Tursiops aduncus) and Burrunan dolphins (Tursiops aduncus australis) frequent the Derwent estuary, and have been be spotted from the beach.

Environment
Local residents have reported seeing southern brown bandicoots (Isoodon obesulus), water rats (Hydromys chrysogaster) and bats, as well as a variety of birdlife, including the little penguin and hollow-nesting bird species such as the musk lorikeet (Glossopsitta concinna). Frogs are known to inhabit wetter areas behind the dunes. The neighbouring reserve contains suitable habitat for the endangered swift parrot (Lathamus discolor), Tasmanian masked owl (Tyto novaehollandiae castanops) and the vulnerable eastern barred bandicoot (Perameles gunnii).

Bellerive Beach is subject to physiological changes due to weather.

Access
Bellerive Beach is accessible from the Hobart City Centre via the Tasman Bridge. It is a one and a half hour walk from the CBD, or a short metro bus ride. There is dedicated parking at the beach directly off Victoria Esplanade, Alexandra Esplanade and Luttrell Avenue.

References

Beaches of Tasmania